Outstanding Aircrew Member's Award (LT Robert A. Perchard Memorial Trophy).
This award was established in 1963 by the parents and friends of the late Lieutenant
Perchard, who died in company with his fellow crewmembers while serving
as co-pilot aboard an HU-16E on a rescue mission in Alaska. Through this award,
each aviation unit is able to recognize an assigned enlisted aircrew member as having
demonstrated exemplary performance and superior technical, aviation, professional,
and leadership abilities. The selection of personnel to be honored with the
Outstanding Aircrew Member's award is made on a semiannual basis using
criteria in keeping with the intent of the award.

3 July 1964

Five Coast Guardsmen were killed when their Grumman HU-16E Albatross, CG Number 7233, crashed on a mountainside near Ketchikan while searching for a grounded fishing vessel. The plane was searching for the fishing vessel Jean, which had grounded on Nunez Rocks and sank. The aircraft was returning to the Coast Guard Air Station on Annette Island when it apparently crashed on Dall Head on Gravina Island, only three miles from the Air Station. The pilot had radioed for landing instructions just prior to the crash.
Crash related deaths:
LCDR Joseph N. Andrassy (CG Aviator #852),
LT Robert A. Perchard (CG Aviator #896),
AO1 Harry W. Olson,
AM2 Don G. Malena,
AT3 Edward A. Krajniak

Notable Recipients
Master Chief Petty Officer of the Coast Guard, Eric A. Trent
Aviation Structural Mechanic First Class, Patrick A. Keller
Avionics Electrical Technician Second Class, Joanne Cobar
Aviation Maintenance Technician Third Class, Brett Cox
Aviation Machinist Mate Senior Chief, Robert C. Crowder

References

United States Coast Guard Aviation